Avtovokzal (Avtovokzal) is a planned Line 1 station of Almaty Metro in Kazakhstan. The construction of the station is expected to start in 2023 which will be located on the north of Rayymbek Avenue and Ashimov Street. An extensive parking area is planned in the area of the station.

References

Almaty Metro stations
Railway stations scheduled to open in 2025